The 1974 Pacific typhoon season was the first season on record to not feature a Category 5 equivalent super typhoon; a feat later repeated by the 1977 and 2017 seasons. Even so, the season was overly active, with 32 tropical storms and 16 typhoons being developed this year. It has no official bounds; it ran year-round in 1974, but most tropical cyclones tend to form in the northwestern Pacific Ocean between June and December. These dates conventionally delimit the period of each year when most tropical cyclones form in the northwestern Pacific Ocean.

The scope of this article is limited to the Pacific Ocean, north of the equator and west of the international date line. Storms that form east of the date line and north of the equator are called hurricanes; see 1974 Pacific hurricane season. Tropical Storms formed in the entire west pacific basin were assigned a name by the Joint Typhoon Warning Center. Tropical depressions in this basin have the "W" suffix added to their number. Tropical depressions that enter or form in the Philippine area of responsibility are assigned a name by the Philippine Atmospheric, Geophysical and Astronomical Services Administration or PAGASA. This can often result in the same storm having two names.

Systems 

35 tropical depressions formed this year in the Western Pacific, of which 32 became tropical storms. 16 storms reached typhoon intensity, and none reached super typhoon strength. This season is the most recent to have no super typhoons.

Severe Tropical Storm Wanda (Atang) 
 A tropical disturbance developed on January 8 to the southwest of Palau. By the next day, the disturbance was upgraded to a tropical depression and to a tropical storm. Wanda reached its peak intensity on January 10 as a 65 mph tropical storm. The storm was then downgraded to a tropical depression on January 11. Wanda then dissipated on January 14.

Tropical Storm Amy 

Tropical Storm Amy formed as a tropical disturbance well south of Guam on March 12, and became a tropical depression on the 14th. It began to turn right late on the 15th, and was heading northeast on the 17th. It became a tropical storm the same day. It transitioned into an extratropical storm on the 19th, and dissipated shortly thereafter.

Severe Tropical Storm Babe 

Tropical Storm Babe formed as a disturbance just west of Chuuk on the 25th of April. It traveled northwestward, becoming a tropical depression on the 26th as it started to turn northward. It passed just west of Guam and Saipan on the 27th and 28th, before strengthening to a tropical storm on the 29th. It continued northward, becoming extratropical on the 1st of May. As an extratropical storm, it traveled northeastward for a few days before dissipating.

Typhoon Carla 

Typhoon Carla was first noted as a disturbance near the island of Pohnpei on the 29th of April. The disturbance traveled northwestward over the next four days, developing into a tropical storm on the 2nd. The center of Carla passed over Tinian and Saipan on the 3rd. The storm began to turn towards the north later that day. It strengthened into a typhoon on the 4th. It reached its maximum intensity — 965 mb central pressure and 80 to 85-knot winds — on the 5th. It began to weaken under intensifying shear after that, becoming a tropical storm again very late that day. It continued in a northeast direction before being absorbed by a frontal system on the 6th.

Typhoon Dinah (Bising) 

Dinah, which developed on June 7, hit Luzon on the 10th as an 80 mph typhoon. It continued northwestward, hit Hainan Island, crossed the Gulf of Tonkin, and dissipated over North Vietnam. Dinah caused 73 casualties (with 33 missing), with $3 million in crop damage (1974 USD).

Tropical Depression 05W 

5W lasted two days and struck southern China.

Severe Tropical Storm Emma (Klaring) 

Emma stayed as a tropical storm.

Tropical Storm Freda 

Freda peaked as a moderate tropical storm.

Typhoon Gilda (Deling) 

When Tropical Storm Gilda, having weakened from a peak of 100 mph winds, crossed between Japan and South Korea in early July, it brought torrential rains and mudslides, killing 128 people (with 26 missing) and causing damage estimated at $1.5 billion (1974 USD).

Tropical Storm Harriet (Gading) 

Harriet did not affect land.

Typhoon Ivy (Iliang) 

66 people were killed when Typhoon Ivy hit Luzon on July 20, the day before the 1974 Miss Universe was held in Manila. It continued northwestward, and hit southeastern China 2 days later.

Severe Tropical Storm Jean (Heling) 

Jean stayed weak.

Severe Tropical Storm Kim 

Kim recurved.

Tropical Depression Loleng 

Only recognized by PAGASA.

Tropical Storm Lucy (Miding) 

Lucy hit China.

Typhoon Mary 

The monsoon trough spawned a tropical depression on August 10. It tracked to the northeast, then turned to the northwest where it became a tropical storm on the 11th. A tug pulling  to Taiwan was overcome by the weather as it sought shelter at Guam, and cut loose Caronia, which was driven against the breakwater at the entrance to Apra Harbor on August 12, blocking all ship traffic. Mary's appearance resembled an extratropical cyclone due to vertical shear, and as the ridge built over Japan, Mary turned more to the west. Conditions were favorable enough for Mary to reach typhoon strength on the 18th, but it weakened to a tropical storm before hitting northeastern China on the 19th. A high pressure system over China forced now Tropical Depression Mary to the southeast, where it restrengthened into a tropical storm on the 24th. The storm turned to the northeast, briefly becoming a typhoon again on the 25th before weakening. Mary hit Japan on the 26th, and dissipated shortly thereafter. 3 people died in Mary's path, with moderate damage occurring.

Tropical Depression 16W 

16W was just a tropical depression and also hit Thailand for a very brief moment.

Severe Tropical Storm Nadine (Norming) 

Nadine did not make landfall.

Tropical Depression 20W 

20W hit China.

Severe Tropical Storm Rose (Oyang) 

Rose did not strike land.

Typhoon Polly 

Polly hit Japan and northern China.

Typhoon Shirley (Pasing) 

Shirley was a minimal typhoon.

Tropical Storm Trix 

Trix hit China.

Typhoon Virginia 

Virginia did not hit land.

Severe Tropical Storm Wendy (Ruping) 

Wendy came near Taiwan and the Philippines.

Typhoon Agnes 

Agnes stayed away from land.

Typhoon Bess (Susang) 

Typhoon Bess crossed northern Luzon on October 10, crossed the South China Sea, and hit Hainan Island on the 13th. Bess continued westward, and dissipated over North Vietnam on the 14th. The storm dumped heavy rains on its path, causing 26 deaths (with 3 missing) and $9.2 million (1974 USD) in damage. The name Bess was retired after this season.

Typhoon Carmen (Tering) 

Typhoon Carmen hit Luzon on October 16, just days after Bess hit. It continued northwestward, made landfall on southeastern China, turned south, and dissipated on the 20th. Typhoon Carmen caused sustained storm force winds in Hong Kong and 25 fatalities, with damage estimated at $13 million (1974 USD).

Typhoon Della (Uding) 

Della passed near the Philippines.

Typhoon Elaine (Wening) 

23 casualties and $21 million in damage can be attributed to 110 mph Typhoon Elaine hitting northern Luzon on October 27.

Severe Tropical Storm Faye (Yaning) 

Faye hit the Philippines and Thailand.

Typhoon Gloria (Aning) 

Glorida moved onshore the Philippines and hit as a typhoon.

Tropical Storm Hester 

Hester formed in the South China Sea.

Typhoon Irma (Bidang) 

The last of the year's 8 typhoons to hit the Philippines made landfall on November 28 as a 100 mph typhoon. Irma, once a 130 mph typhoon, weakened over the islands and restrengthened into a typhoon in the South China Sea. It turned northward, and hit southern China as a weakening tropical storm on December 2, the latest date for a Chinese tropical storm landfall. Irma killed 11 people, and caused $7.3 million in damage (1974 USD).

Tropical Storm Judy (Kading) 

Judy developed in the South China Sea.

Tropical Storm Kit (Delang) 

Kit developed on December 18 in the open Pacific. Upon hitting the Philippines, the system weakened to a tropical depression. The storm re-intensified to a tropical storm in the South China Sea before dissipating on December 24.

Storm names 

During the season 32 named tropical cyclones developed in the Western Pacific and were named by the Joint Typhoon Warning Center, when it was determined that they had become tropical storms. These names were contributed to a revised list from late 1950.

The name Olive from this list was used for a storm that formed in the Central Pacific.

Philippines 

The Philippine Atmospheric, Geophysical and Astronomical Services Administration uses its own naming scheme for tropical cyclones in their area of responsibility. PAGASA assigns names to tropical depressions that form within their area of responsibility and any tropical cyclone that might move into their area of responsibility. Should the list of names for a given year prove to be insufficient, names are taken from an auxiliary list, the first 6 of which are published each year before the season starts. Names not retired from this list will be used again in the 1978 season. This is the same list used for the 1970 season. PAGASA uses its own naming scheme that starts in the Filipino alphabet, with names of Filipino female names ending with "ng" (A, B, K, D, etc.). Names that were not assigned/going to use are marked in gray.

Due to an extreme impact in the Philippines, PAGASA later retired the name Wening and was replaced by Weling for the 1978 season.

Season effects 
This table will list all the storms that developed in the northwestern Pacific Ocean west of the International Date Line and north of the equator during 1974. It will include their intensity, duration, name, areas affected, deaths, and damage totals. Classification and intensity values will be based on estimations conducted by the JMA, the JTWC, and/or PAGASA. Peak wind speeds are in one-minute sustained standards unless otherwise noted. All damage figures will be in 1974 USD. Damages and deaths from a storm will include when the storm was a precursor wave or an extratropical low.

|-
| Wanda (Atang) ||  || bgcolor=#| || bgcolor=#| || bgcolor=#| || Mariana Islands || None || None ||
|-
| Amy ||  || bgcolor=#| || bgcolor=#| || bgcolor=#| || Caroline Islands, Mariana Islands || None || None ||
|-
| Babe ||  || bgcolor=#| || bgcolor=#| || bgcolor=#| || Mariana Islands || None || None ||
|-
| Carla ||  || bgcolor=#| || bgcolor=#| || bgcolor=#| || Mariana Islands || None || None ||
|-
| TD ||  || bgcolor=#| || bgcolor=#| || bgcolor=#| || Caroline Islands ||  ||  ||
|-
| TD ||  || bgcolor=#| || bgcolor=#| || bgcolor=#| || Palau ||  ||  ||
|-
| Dinah (Bising) ||  || bgcolor=#| || bgcolor=#| || bgcolor=#| || Philippines, South China ||  ||  ||
|-
| 05W ||  || bgcolor=#| || bgcolor=#| || bgcolor=#| || South China ||  ||  ||
|-
| Emma (Klaring) ||  || bgcolor=#| || bgcolor=#| || bgcolor=#| || Ryukyu Islands || None || None ||
|-
| Freda ||  || bgcolor=#| || bgcolor=#| || bgcolor=#| || None || None || None ||
|-
| Gilda (Deling) ||  || bgcolor=#| || bgcolor=#| || bgcolor=#| || Ryukyu Islands, South Korea, Japan ||  ||  ||
|-
| Emang ||  || bgcolor=#| || bgcolor=#| || bgcolor=#| || None ||  ||  ||
|-
| Harriet (Gading) ||  || bgcolor=#| || bgcolor=#| || bgcolor=#| || None || None || None ||
|-
| Ivy (Iliang) ||  || bgcolor=#| || bgcolor=#| || bgcolor=#| || Philippines, South China || Unknown ||  ||
|-
| Jean (Heling) ||  || bgcolor=#| || bgcolor=#| || bgcolor=#| || Taiwan, East China || None || None ||
|-
| Kim ||  || bgcolor=#| || bgcolor=#| || bgcolor=#| || None || None || None ||
|-
| TD ||  || bgcolor=#| || bgcolor=#| || bgcolor=#| || None ||  ||  ||
|-
| TD ||  || bgcolor=#| || bgcolor=#| || bgcolor=#| || None ||  ||  ||
|-
| Loleng ||  || bgcolor=#| || bgcolor=#| || bgcolor=#| || Philippines ||  ||  ||
|-
| Lucy (Miding) ||  || bgcolor=#| || bgcolor=#| || bgcolor=#| || None || None || None ||
|-
| TD ||  || bgcolor=#| || bgcolor=#| || bgcolor=#| || None ||  ||  ||
|-
| TD ||  || bgcolor=#| || bgcolor=#| || bgcolor=#| || Taiwan ||  ||  ||
|-
| TD ||  || bgcolor=#| || bgcolor=#| || bgcolor=#| || None ||  ||  ||
|-
| TD ||  || bgcolor=#| || bgcolor=#| || bgcolor=#| || Mariana Islands ||  ||  ||
|-
| TD ||  || bgcolor=#| || bgcolor=#| || bgcolor=#| || Mariana Islands ||  ||  ||
|-
| TD ||  || bgcolor=#| || bgcolor=#| || bgcolor=#| || None ||  ||  ||
|-
| Mary ||  || bgcolor=#| || bgcolor=#| || bgcolor=#| || Mariana Islands, East China, Ryukyu Islands, Japan || Unknown ||  ||
|-
| 16W ||  || bgcolor=#| || bgcolor=#| || bgcolor=#| || Vietnam, Laos, Thailand ||  ||  ||
|-
| Nadine (Norming) ||  || bgcolor=#| || bgcolor=#| || bgcolor=#| || None || None || None ||
|-
| TD ||  || bgcolor=#| || bgcolor=#| || bgcolor=#| || None ||  ||  ||
|-
| Rose (Oyang) ||  || bgcolor=#| || bgcolor=#| || bgcolor=#| || Taiwan, Ryukyu Islands || None || None ||
|-
| Polly ||  || bgcolor=#| || bgcolor=#| || bgcolor=#| || Mariana Islands, Japan || Unknown || Unknown ||
|-
| 20W ||  || bgcolor=#| || bgcolor=#| || bgcolor=#| || Ryukyu Islands ||  ||  ||
|-
| TD ||  || bgcolor=#| || bgcolor=#| || bgcolor=#| || None ||  ||  ||
|-
| TD ||  || bgcolor=#| || bgcolor=#| || bgcolor=#| || None ||  ||  ||
|-
| Shirley (Pasing) ||  || bgcolor=#| || bgcolor=#| || bgcolor=#| || Ryukyu Islands, Japan || Unknown || Unknown ||
|-
| TD ||  || bgcolor=#| || bgcolor=#| || bgcolor=#| || Japan ||  ||  ||
|-
| Trix ||  || bgcolor=#| || bgcolor=#| || bgcolor=#| || South China || None || None ||
|-
| TD ||  || bgcolor=#| || bgcolor=#| || bgcolor=#| || None ||  ||  ||
|-
| Virginia ||  || bgcolor=#| || bgcolor=#| || bgcolor=#| || None || None || None ||
|-
| TD ||  || bgcolor=#| || bgcolor=#| || bgcolor=#| || Philippines ||  ||  ||
|-
| TD ||  || bgcolor=#| || bgcolor=#| || bgcolor=#| || None ||  ||  ||
|-
| TD ||  || bgcolor=#| || bgcolor=#| || bgcolor=#| || Philippines ||  ||  ||
|-
| Wendy (Ruping) ||  || bgcolor=#| || bgcolor=#| || bgcolor=#| || Philippines, Taiwan, Ryukyu Islands || None || None ||
|-
| Agnes ||  || bgcolor=#| || bgcolor=#| || bgcolor=#| || None || None || None ||
|-
| Bess (Susang) ||  || bgcolor=#| || bgcolor=#| || bgcolor=#| || Philippines, South China, Vietnam ||  ||  ||
|-
| Carmen (Tering) ||  || bgcolor=#| || bgcolor=#| || bgcolor=#| || Philippines, South China ||  ||  ||
|-
| Della (Uding) ||  || bgcolor=#| || bgcolor=#| || bgcolor=#| || Philippines, South China, Vietnam || Unknown || Unknown ||
|-
| Elaine (Wening) ||  || bgcolor=#| || bgcolor=#| || bgcolor=#| || Philippines, South China ||  ||  ||
|-
| Faye (Yaning) ||  || bgcolor=#| || bgcolor=#| || bgcolor=#| || Philippines, Indochina || None || None ||
|-
| Gloria (Aning) ||  || bgcolor=#| || bgcolor=#| || bgcolor=#| || Philippines || Unknown || Unknown ||
|-
| Hester ||  || bgcolor=#| || bgcolor=#| || bgcolor=#| || Vietnam || None || None ||
|-
| Irma (Bidang) ||  || bgcolor=#| || bgcolor=#| || bgcolor=#| || Philippines, South China ||  ||  ||
|-
| Judy (Kading) ||  || bgcolor=#| || bgcolor=#| || bgcolor=#| || Philippines, Vietnam || None || None ||
|-
| Kit (Delang) ||  || bgcolor=#| || bgcolor=#| || bgcolor=#| || Philippines || None || None ||
|-

See also 

 List of tropical cyclones
 1974 Pacific hurricane season
 1974 Atlantic hurricane season
 1974 North Indian Ocean cyclone season
 Australian cyclone seasons: 1973–74, 1974–75
 South Pacific cyclone seasons: 1973–74, 1974–75
 South-West Indian Ocean cyclone seasons: 1973–74, 1974–75

References

External links 
 Japan Meteorological Agency
 Joint Typhoon Warning Center.
 China Meteorological Agency
 National Weather Service Guam
 Hong Kong Observatory
 Macau Meteorological Geophysical Services
 Korea Meteorological Agency
 Philippine Atmospheric, Geophysical and Astronomical Services Administration
 Taiwan Central Weather Bureau
 Digital Typhoon - Typhoon Images and Information
 Typhoon2000 Philippine typhoon website